Herbert Kirchhoff (1911–1988) was a German art director.

Selected filmography 
 Nora's Ark (1948)
 My Wife's Friends (1949)
 The Last Night (1949)
 Second Hand Destiny (1949)
 Third from the Right (1950)
 Harbour Melody (1950)
 The Man in Search of Himself (1950)
 Maya of the Seven Veils (1951)
 Poison in the Zoo (1952)
 Dancing Stars (1952)
 Under the Thousand Lanterns (1952)
 The Singing Hotel (1953)
 Not Afraid of Big Animals (1953)
 The Flower of Hawaii (1953)
 Dancing in the Sun (1954)
 Money from the Air (1954)
 Columbus Discovers Kraehwinkel (1954)
 How Do I Become a Film Star? (1955)
 Operation Sleeping Bag (1955)
 Secrets of the City (1955)
 Ball at the Savoy (1955)
 The False Adam (1955)
 Music in the Blood (1955)
 A Heart Returns Home (1956)
 Between Time and Eternity (1956)
 Heart Without Mercy  (1958)
 The Woman by the Dark Window (1960)
 Pension Schöller (1960)
 Beloved Impostor (1961)

References

Bibliography 
 Bergfelder, Tim. International Adventures: German Popular Cinema and European Co-Productions in the 1960s. Berghahn Books, 2005.

External links 
 

1911 births
1988 deaths
German art directors
Mass media people from Braunschweig